Walsh's Building formerly known as the Economic Store Building is a building in Perth, Western Australia. It was designed by Talbot Hobbs.

Site
The building is located on the corner of Hay Street and William Street, Perth. It stands opposite the Gledden Building and Wesley Church, two other heritage listed buildings on this corner. The current building replaced the previous Economic Store building that had been destroyed by fire in 1921.

Architecture
The building was designed in the Inter-war Art Deco style by Talbot Hobbs, an architect responsible for a number of buildings in the Perth Central Business District.

Construction
Construction on the site began in 1922 and was complete by early 1923. The lead contractor was C.W. Arnott.

A  renovation of the building was completed in late 2012.

Usage
The first major tenant in the building was the Economic Store, of which the Perth Mayor Sir William Lathlain was the proprietor.

The building took on its current name when the Walsh's Menswear store opened on the ground level.

The basement of the building was used as a food court until a 2007 fire caused extensive damage, forcing its closure.

It was classified by the National Trust of Australia in 1978.

References

Landmarks in Perth, Western Australia
Heritage places in Perth, Western Australia
Art Deco architecture in Western Australia
Hay Street, Perth
William Street, Perth